Bobbejaanland is a theme park in Lichtaart, Belgium. The park was founded by Bobbejaan Schoepen, a Flemish singer, guitarist, and entertainer who enjoyed international success in the fifties and early sixties. In 1959, he bought a 30 hectare marsh, had it drained and built a 1,000 capacity venue that opened in December 1961 as Bobbejaanland. This developed into an amusement park and remained in his possession until he sold it in 2004.

History
For its first decade after opening the park centered on water attractions and performance spaces. Numerous variety artists from Belgium, the Netherlands and Germany appeared there. Following the advice of Phantasialand owner Gottlieb Löffelhard, Bobbejaanland evolved from 1975 onwards into a theme park, with rides becoming more important than music shows. It grew to fifty attractions with four hundred employees and received visitors from the Benelux countries, France, and Germany. As an independent family concern, it also supported educational and cultural projects. By the end of the seventies, Schoepen's wife Josée (a former opera singer and model) opened a museum with works of art from the Hopi and Navajo cultures, forming an extensive private collection of Native American art.

From the 1990s, three of his five children worked for the park.

Attractions

Bobbejaanland contains about 50 attractions, such as the Waterslide (1980), the Giant wheel (1976), Indiana River (indoor flume ride, 1991), the Revolution (a dark Rollercoaster, 1989), the Speedy Bob (roller coaster, 1998), the Air Race (suspended roller coaster, 1987, now named Dreamcatcher), the longest junior roller coaster in the world, 'Okidoki' (i.e. 'that's all right', 2003–04), and the world's second Gerstlauer Euro-Fighter roller coaster, "Typhoon" (2003–04), with a drop angle of over 97°(a roller coaster with a fourfold loop and a free fall) and a Splash Battle, "Banana Battle", (2007) made by Preston & Barbieri. The giant Sledgehammer (a Giant Frisbee) reaches a speed of 110 km/h). In 1995 'Kinderland' (English: Kids' Country) was opened as an area for young children.

In 1979, Bobbejaanland opened the Looping Star roller coaster (Schwarzkopf GmbH). Although the ride had a security bar placed over the hip, it was more the centrifugal force which held the passengers in the vehicle when it looped the loop. The coaster was dismantled in 2003.

Bobbejaanland also has Revolution: a fully enclosed tubular steel roller coaster manufactured by Vekoma, with world's largest train where two passengers can sit bobsled style per car. In 2016, the attraction was equipped with Samsung Gear VR. In the morning, the original ride is active. In the afternoon, passengers have the option to wear the virtual glasses and the ride is about an escape from the erupting volcano "Mount Mara". Due to this concept only one passenger per car can wear the glasses. Physical limitations prohibit children to wear the glasses as they don't fit on their head.

Because Bobbejaan Schoepen was primarily a folk and country singer, the park is still partly themed as a western village (for example the El Rio White Water Rapids and the El Paso Dark ride). In the Star Theater, Las Vegas style shows are performed. Bobbejaan bought Zorro's horse from stuntman Casey Tibbs, but the animal was accidentally electrocuted by an exposed cable. He also acquired an ornate white Pontiac Nudie mobile decorated with American coins.

Changes

In the winter of 2003, the park invested 12 million dollars in two new rides named the Typhoon and the Sledge Hammer. In a 2004 survey of 13 European amusement parks by Belgian consumer organisation Test-Aankoop Bobbejaanland was rated second after Phantasialand.

In the early 2000s, the founder was diagnosed with cancer and he sold Bobbejaanland to the Spanish-American Parques Reunidos group in April 2004.

References

Sources
Bobbejaan Schoepen (Johan Roggen, Publisher Het Volk, 1980 - D/1980/2345/10).
De Vlaamse kleinkunstbeweging na de Tweede Wereldoorlog - Een historisch overzicht (Peter Notte, Universiteit Gent 1992). 'The Flemish Variety Movement after World War II - An Historical Overview'. Peter Notte, Ghent University, 1992)
Bobbejaan Schoepen — "Histories" documentary, 4 January 2001 (Canvas/VRT)
Bobbejaan Schoepen — The Belgian Pop & Rock Archive (Dirk Houbrechts and the Flanders Music Center, 2001).
"Brel Le flamand" — Histories documentary, 2003 (Canvas/VRT).
 rides.nl
Bobbejaan Schoepen Archive — Bobbejaan Records bvba
Official Biography Bobbejaan Schoepen  — by Tom Schoepen - "Volkskundige Kroniek" van de Federatie voor Volkskunde in Vlaanderen (i.e. “Folklife Chronicles”, magazine of the Folklife Federation Flanders)- yr. 14 - nr. 2 April-may-juin 2006).

External links
Bobbejaanland Website (English)
Official site Bobbejaan Schoepen
Official myspace Bobbejaan Schoepen
The Yodeling Whistler
Bobbejaanland Timeline
Bobbejaanland Fansite (Dutch)
Bobbejaan-Online (Dutch)

1961 establishments in Belgium
Amusement parks opened in 1961
Amusement parks in Belgium
Western (genre) theme parks
Buildings and structures in Antwerp Province
Parques Reunidos
Tourist attractions in Antwerp Province
Kasterlee